Bao Jiaping (10 August 1908 – 11 November 1992) was a Chinese footballer. He competed in the men's tournament at the 1936 Summer Olympics.

References

External links
 

1908 births
1992 deaths
Chinese footballers
China international footballers
Olympic footballers of China
Footballers at the 1936 Summer Olympics
Place of birth missing
Association football goalkeepers
20th-century Chinese people